Infinite Jest is an EP by American indie rock band We Are The Fury. It was released in 2006 as a re-issue of their 2005 EP The Fury. Its name is taken from the David Foster Wallace novel entitled Infinite Jest, the title of which is in turn taken from a line in William Shakespeare's Hamlet.

It was the band's second EP and the only one to be released under the New Armada record label. Following the release of this EP, the band moved to One Big Spark and released their debut album, Venus.

The EP is available to listen to on the band's PureVolume page.

Track listing 
The album contains five tracks:

References 

We Are the Fury albums